The Regional Universities Network (RUN) is a network of seven universities primarily from regional Australia, as well as campuses in the Australian capital cities and some international campuses.

Members

History
The Regional Universities Network was formed in October 2011 as a response to the regional focus for higher education of Australian government. Many of these universities were part of a previous group, known as the "New Generation Universities". The current Chairperson of the Network is Professor Nick Klomp, of Central Queensland University.

On 29 May 2019, Charles Sturt University has announced it will join the Regional Universities Network (RUN), becoming the seventh member of the group.

The Members of this group are:
Central Queensland University
Charles Sturt University
Federation University Australia
Southern Cross University
University of New England
University of Southern Queensland
University of the Sunshine Coast

Map

See also

References

External links
Regional Universities Network Homepage

College and university associations and consortia in Australia